The 2004 Generali Ladies Linz is the 2004 Tier II WTA Tour tournament of the annually-held Generali Ladies Linz tennis tournament. It was the 18th edition of the tournament and was held from October 23–30, 2004 at the TipsArena Linz. Amélie Mauresmo won the singles title.

Points and prize money

Point distribution

Prize money

* per team

Singles main draw entrants

Seeds 

Rankings are as of 18 October 2004.

Other entrants 
The following players received wildcards into the singles main draw:
  Sybille Bammer
  Amélie Mauresmo
  Barbara Schett

The following players received entry from the qualifying draw:
  Vera Dushevina
  Alina Jidkova
  Julia Schruff
  Martina Suchá

The following players received entry as lucky losers:
  Marta Domachowska
  Lindsay Lee-Waters

Withdrawals 
  Anastasia Myskina → replaced by  Marta Domachowska
  Flavia Pennetta → replaced by  Lindsay Lee-Waters

Retirements 
  Conchita Martínez (Achilles tendon strain)

Doubles main draw entrants

Seeds 

Rankings are as of 18 October 2004

Other entrants
The following pairs received wildcards into the doubles main draw:
  Daniela Kix /  Yvonne Meusburger
  Karolina Šprem /  Vera Zvonareva

The following pair received entry into the main draw via a protected ranking:
  Julia Schruff /  Åsa Svensson

The following pair received entry from the qualifying draw:
  Jelena Janković /  Caroline Schneider

Champions

Singles

  Amélie Mauresmo defeated  Elena Bovina, 6–2, 6–0.
It was Mauresmo's 14th WTA singles title, and fourth title of the year.

Doubles

  Janette Husárová /  Elena Likhovtseva defeated  Nathalie Dechy /  Patty Schnyder, 6–2, 7–5.
It was Husárová's 18th WTA doubles title, and third of the year. It was Likhovtseva's 20th WTA doubles title, and third of the year. This was the first of two doubles titles they won together as a pair.

References

Generali Ladies Linz
Linz Open
Generali Ladies Linz
Generali Ladies Linz
Generali